Federal Route 197, or Jalan Tok Deh-Gual Periok (formerly Kelantan State Route D185), is a federal road in Kelantan, Malaysia.

Features

At most sections, the Federal Route 197 was built under the JKR R5 road standard, allowing maximum speed limit of up to 90 km/h.

List of junctions and towns

References

Malaysian Federal Roads